David Harding (born 14 August 1946) is an English former football (soccer) midfielder. He played for Wrexham from 1965 to 1966, New Brighton in the Cheshire League 1967-68 and then South Liverpool in the Northern Premier League, before moving to Australia where he played for Pan Hellenic, Western Suburbs, Blacktown City and APIA until 1981. In this time he won NSW representative honours in 1974 against Bristol Rovers.

Harding was a member of the Australian 1974 World Cup squad in West Germany and represented Australia 45 times between 1974 and 1977 scoring 11 times.

More recently he has played for non-league Hatfield Lions in the WELAFA Premier league before moving to Division One side London Fields FC where he continues his impressive scoring record.

References

1946 births
Living people
English emigrants to Australia
English footballers
Australian soccer players
Australian expatriate soccer players
Australia international soccer players
Australian expatriate sportspeople in England
1974 FIFA World Cup players
National Soccer League (Australia) players
APIA Leichhardt FC players
Wrexham A.F.C. players
Footballers from Liverpool
Association football midfielders
South Liverpool F.C. players